The Canton Area School District is a diminutive, rural, Pennsylvania public school district that encompasses approximately . Canton Area School District is split over three counties. In Bradford County, it serves Canton Township including Canton Borough; while excluding the borough of Alba, and Leroy Township. In Lycoming County, the district serves McIntyre Township including the villages of Marsh Hill and Ralston; and McNett Township including the villages of Chemung, Ellenton, Leolyn, Penbryn, and Roaring Branch. In Tioga County, the district serves Union Township. According to 2000 local census data, the district serves a resident population of 6,213. By 2010, the district's population increased to 6,534 people. The educational attainment levels for the Canton Area School District population (25 years old and over) were 86.6% high school graduates and 10.9% college graduates. The district is one of the 500 public school districts of Pennsylvania.

According to the Pennsylvania Budget and Policy Center, 45.4% of the Canton Area School District's pupils lived at 185% or below the Federal Poverty Level  as shown by their eligibility for the federal free or reduced price school meal programs in 2012. In 2009, Canton Area School District residents’ per capita income was $14,597, while the median family income was $37,156. In the Commonwealth, the median family income was $49,501 and the United States median family income was $49,445, in 2010. By 2013, the median household income in the United States rose to $52,100.

Canton Area School District operates 2 traditional schools: Canton Area Elementary School and Canton Junior Senior High School. The district also operates an alternative school called the Focus Support Academy. The program presents a placement for at risk students and those with behavioral issues that disrupt the classroom. The facility can accommodate up to twelve students. Focus Support Academy is located in the Gleckner building in Canton. When a student needs more intensive services like constant emotional support services, an out-of-district placement is pursued. Canton Area High School students may attend Northern Tier Career Center for vocational training.

Extracurriculars
The Canton Area School District offers a variety of clubs, activities and sports for high school and junior high school students. Eligibility to participate is set by school board policies.

Clubs
Band
Students Against Destructive Decisions
FFA
Language clubs
Scholarship Challenge
Library Club
DJ Club

Sports
The district provides the following varsity sports:

Boys
Baseball- A
Basketball - AA
Cross country - A
Football - A
Track and field - AA
Wrestling	 - AA

Girls
Basketball - A
Cheerleading - AAAA
Cross Country - A
Softball - A
Track and field - AA
Volleyball - A

Junior high school sports

Boys
Basketball
Cross country
Football
Track and field
Wrestling	

Girls
Basketball
Cross country
Track and field
Volleyball

According to PIAA directory July 2015

References

School districts in Bradford County, Pennsylvania
School districts in Lycoming County, Pennsylvania
School districts in Tioga County, Pennsylvania
Education in Tioga County, Pennsylvania